Neurophyseta is a genus of moths of the family Crambidae.

Species
Neurophyseta aetalis Walker, 1859
Neurophyseta albicomma (Swinhoe, 1894)
Neurophyseta albimarginalis Schaus, 1920
Neurophyseta albinalis Hampson, 1912
Neurophyseta albirufa Hampson, 1912
Neurophyseta arcigrammalis Hampson, 1912
Neurophyseta arcuatalis Hampson, 1912
Neurophyseta argyroleuca Hampson, 1912
Neurophyseta auralis Hampson, 1912
Neurophyseta avertinalis 
Neurophyseta bolusalis 
Neurophyseta camptogrammalis Hampson, 1912
Neurophyseta clymenalis (Walker, 1859)
Neurophyseta comoralis (Strand, 1916)
Neurophyseta completalis 
Neurophyseta conantia Phillips & Solis, 1996
Neurophyseta cyclicalis Schaus, 1913
Neurophyseta dabiusalis 
Neurophyseta damescalis Guenée, 1854
Neurophyseta debalis 
Neurophyseta diplogrammalis Hampson, 1912
Neurophyseta disciatralis 
Neurophyseta durgalis Schaus, 1920
Neurophyseta flavirufalis 
Neurophyseta fulvalis Hampson, 1912
Neurophyseta fulvistrigalis 
Neurophyseta graphicalis 
Neurophyseta hoenei (Caradja in Caradja & Meyrick, 1934)
Neurophyseta interruptalis (Wileman & South, 1917)
Neurophyseta irrectalis (Guenée, 1854)
Neurophyseta jessica Phillips & Solis, 1996
Neurophyseta laothoealis (Walker, 1859)
Neurophyseta laudamialis 
Neurophyseta marin Phillips & Solis, 1996
Neurophyseta mellograpta 
Neurophyseta mesophaealis 
Neurophyseta mineolalis (Schaus, 1940)
Neurophyseta mollitalis (Schaus, 1912)
Neurophyseta narcissusalis (Walker, 1859)
Neurophyseta normalis Hampson, 1912
Neurophyseta paroalis 
Neurophyseta perlalis 
Neurophyseta perrivalis Hampson, 1912
Neurophyseta phaeozonalis (Hampson, 1906)
Neurophyseta pomperialis 
Neurophyseta purifactalis 
Neurophyseta randalis (Druce, 1896)
Neurophyseta renata Phillips & Solis, 1996
Neurophyseta rufalis Hampson, 1912
Neurophyseta saniralis (Viette, 1989)
Neurophyseta sittenfelda Phillips & Solis, 1996
Neurophyseta sogalalis (Viette, 1989)
Neurophyseta stigmatalis 
Neurophyseta taiwanalis (Shibuya, 1928)
Neurophyseta turrialbalis Schaus, 1912
Neurophyseta upupalis (Guenée, 1862)
Neurophyseta ursmaralis Schaus, 1927
Neurophyseta ustalis (Walker, 1865)
Neurophyseta villarda Phillips & Solis, 1996
Neurophyseta virginalis 
Neurophyseta volcanalis Schaus, 1920
Neurophyseta zobeida Phillips & Solis, 1996

Former species
Neurophyseta dasymalis 
Neurophyseta fulvilinealis 
Neurophyseta subpuralis

References

Natural History Museum Lepidoptera genus database

Musotiminae
Crambidae genera
Taxa named by George Hampson